Menominee Township may refer to the following places in the United States:

 Menominee Township, Jo Daviess County, Illinois
 Menominee Township, Michigan

See also: Menominee (disambiguation)

Township name disambiguation pages